The British Academy Television Craft Award for Best Writer: Drama is one of the categories presented by the British Academy of Film and Television Arts (BAFTA) within the British Academy Television Craft Awards, the craft awards were established in 2000 with their own, separate ceremony as a way to spotlight technical achievements, without being overshadowed by the main production categories.

An award for the writers of a television program was existed since the creation of the BAFTA Television Awards with categories named Best Script, Best Scriptwriter and Writer being presented from the 50s to the 70s. In 2006 the category Best Writer was created, this category was awarded until 2013 when it was split into two separate categories (Writer: Comedy and Writer: Drama) to recognise the differences in writing for comedy and drama programmes on television.

Winners and nominees

1950s
Writers Award

Best Scriptwriter

1960s
Best Scriptwriter

Best Script

1970s
Best Script

2000s

2010s
Best Writer

Best Writer: Drama

2020s

See also
 Primetime Emmy Award for Outstanding Writing for a Drama Series
 Primetime Emmy Award for Outstanding Writing for a Limited Series, Movie, or Dramatic Special

References

External links
 

Writer: Drama